The Hills mechanism is a phenomenon that occurs when a binary star system is disrupted by a supermassive black hole.

Tidal forces from the black hole cause one of the stars to be captured by it, and fall into an orbit around it. The other star is thrown away from the black hole at very high speeds. The phenomenon was proposed by astronomer Jack Hills in 1988 and confirmed in 2019, when an example of such a jettisoned star was observed. This ejected star, namely S5-HVS1, an A-type main-sequence star, notable as the fastest star detected as of November 2019, has been determined to be traveling at nearly four million miles an hour (more specifically, almost 0.6% of the speed of light) away from the galactic core  of the Milky Way.

References

See also 
 Penrose process